Wu Tang-chieh is a Taiwanese politician. He was the Political Deputy Minister of Finance in the Executive Yuan from 2 September 2013 until 20 May 2016.

Education
Wu holds a bachelor's degree in finance and taxation from National Chung Hsing University, master's degree in finance from National Chengchi University and doctoral degree in law from University of Wisconsin in the United States.

Financial Supervisory Commission vice chairperson

More fair and friendly Taiwan stock trading
In December 2012, Wu said that the ROC government aims to take measures in the coming year to make stock trading in Taiwan more fair and friendly. He elaborated that there are four plans to achieve the goal, which are increasing market momentum, diversifying quality financial products, cutting the trading costs and increasing international visibility.

With regards to the implementation of stock gains tax which was set to be effective starting on 1 January 2013, Wu said that the tax will not have a major impact on Taiwan's stock market.

References

Living people
Taiwanese Ministers of Finance
Year of birth missing (living people)